The Journal of Geriatric Cardiology is a quarterly peer-reviewed open-access medical journal published by Science Press. The journal covers all aspects of cardiovascular disease in elderly people, especially those with concomitant diseases of other major organ-systems. The founding editor-in-chief was Shi-Wen Wang. The current editor is Hai-Yun Wu.

Abstracting and indexing 
The journal is abstracted and indexed in the Science Citation Index Expanded, PubMed Central, Scopus, and Embase. According to the Journal Citation Reports, the journal has a 2013 impact factor of 1.056.

References

External links 
 

Gerontology journals
Cardiology journals
English-language journals
Quarterly journals
Publications established in 2004